The Kingdom of Portugal was a monarchy in the western Iberian Peninsula and the predecessor of the modern Portuguese Republic. Existing to various extents between 1139 and 1910, it was also known as the Kingdom of Portugal and the Algarves after 1415, and as the United Kingdom of Portugal, Brazil and the Algarves between 1815 and 1822. The name is also often applied to the Portuguese Empire, the realm's overseas colonies.

The nucleus of the Portuguese state was the County of Portugal, established in the 9th century as part of the Reconquista, by Vímara Peres, a vassal of the King of Asturias. The county became part of the Kingdom of León in 1097, and the Counts of Portugal established themselves as rulers of an independent kingdom in the 12th century, following the battle of São Mamede. The kingdom was ruled by the Alfonsine Dynasty until the 1383–85 Crisis, after which the monarchy passed to the House of Aviz.

During the 15th and 16th century, Portuguese exploration established a vast colonial empire. From 1580 to 1640, the Kingdom of Portugal was in personal union with Habsburg Spain.

After the Portuguese Restoration War of 1640–1668, the kingdom passed to the House of Braganza and thereafter to the House of Braganza-Saxe-Coburg and Gotha. From this time, the influence of Portugal declined, but it remained a major power due to its most valuable colony, Brazil. After the independence of Brazil, Portugal sought to establish itself in Africa, but was ultimately forced to halt its expansion due to the 1890 British Ultimatum, eventually leading to the collapse of the monarchy in the 5 October 1910 revolution and the establishment of the First Portuguese Republic.

Portugal was an absolute monarchy before 1822. It alternated between absolute and constitutional monarchy from 1822 until 1834, when it would remain  a constitutional monarchy until its fall.

History

Origins 
The Kingdom of Portugal finds its origins in the County of Portugal (1096–1139). The Portuguese County was a semi-autonomous county of the Kingdom of León. Independence from León took place in three stages:

 The first on 26 July 1139 when Afonso Henriques was acclaimed King of the Portuguese internally.
 The second was on 5 October 1143, when Alfonso VII of León and Castile recognized Afonso Henriques as king through the Treaty of Zamora.
 The third, in 1179, was the Papal Bull Manifestis Probatum, in which Portugal's independence was recognized by Pope Alexander III.

Once Portugal was independent, D. Afonso I's descendants, members of the Portuguese House of Burgundy, would rule Portugal until 1383. Even after the change in royal houses, all the monarchs of Portugal were descended from Afonso I, one way or another, through both legitimate and illegitimate links.

Medieval history (1139–1415)

Renaissance and early modern history (1415–1777)

Modern history (1777–1910)

Fall of the Monarchy 

With the start of the 20th century, Republicanism grew in numbers and support in Lisbon among progressive politicians and the influential press. However a minority with regard to the rest of the country, this height of republicanism would benefit politically from the Lisbon Regicide on 1 February 1908. While returning from the Ducal Palace at Vila Viçosa, King Charles and the Prince Royal Luís Filipe were assassinated in the Terreiro do Paço, in Lisbon. With the death of the King and his heir, Charles I's second son would become monarch as King Manuel II. Manuel's reign, however, would be short-lived, ending by force with the 5 October 1910 revolution, sending Manuel into exile in Great Britain and giving way to the Portuguese First Republic.

On 19 January 1919, the Monarchy of the North was proclaimed in Oporto. The monarchy would be deposed a month later and no other monarchist counterrevolution in Portugal has happened since.

After the republican revolution in October 1910, the remaining colonies of the empire became overseas provinces of the Portuguese Republic until the late 20th century, when the last overseas territories of Portugal were handed over. Most notably in Portuguese Africa which included the overseas provinces of Angola and Mozambique of which  the handover took place in 1975, and finally in Asia the handover of Macau in 1999.

Rulers

Gallery

See also 
 Kingdom of Algarve
 United Kingdom of Portugal, Brazil and the Algarves
 List of titles and honours of the Portuguese Crown
 Portuguese nobility
 Portuguese heraldry

Footnotes

Citations

References 

 Joaquim Veríssimo Serrão, História de Portugal: Do mindelo á regeneração (1832–1851)
 José Mattoso, António Manuel Hespanha, História de Portugal 4: O Antigo Regime (1620–1807), (1998) 
 Simão José da Luz Soriano, Historia da Guerra Civil e do estabelecimento do governo parlamentar em Portugal: comprehedendo a historia diplomatica, militar e politica d'este reino desde 1777 até 1834 Volume 9 (1893)
 Jacinto de São Miguel (Frei), Martinho Augusto Ferreira da Fonseca, Mosteiro de Belém: Relação da insigne e real casa de Santa Maria de Belém (1901)
 Mark Willner, George Hero, Jerry Weiner, Global History Volume I: The Ancient World to the Age of Revolution (2006) 
 Douglas L. Wheeler, Republican Portugal: A Political History, 1910–1926 (1998) 

 
1139 establishments in Europe
12th-century establishments in Portugal
1910 disestablishments in Portugal
1910 disestablishments in the Portuguese Empire
Kingdom 01
Portugal
Kingdom 01
Portugal 01
Portugal 01
Portugal 01
Kingdom 01
Kingdom 01
Kingdom 01
Kingdom 01
Kingdom 01
States and territories disestablished in 1910
States and territories established in 1139